Mads Bech Sørensen (born 7 January 1999), sometimes known as Mads Bech, is a Danish professional footballer who plays as a centre-back for Eredivisie club Groningen, on loan from  club Brentford. Sørensen began his career in his native Denmark with AC Horsens and transferred to Brentford in 2017. He was capped by Denmark at youth level.

Club career

AC Horsens
A left-sided central defender, Sørensen began his youth career with Østbirk IF as a juvenile, before transferring to the academy at AC Horsens in 2011. After progressing through the youth ranks, he won his maiden call into the first team squad for a Danish 1st Division match versus HB Køge on 3 May 2015. At age 16 years, three months and 26 days, Sørensen became Horsens' youngest-ever player when he started in the 1–1 draw and he remained on the pitch until being substituted for Malthe Boesen (the player who had previously held the record) after 75 minutes. He made five further appearances during the remainder of the 2014–15 season and signed a new two-year contract on 9 June 2015.

Over the course of the 2015–16 and 2016–17 seasons, Sørensen continued to make a handful of appearances a season, mostly as a substitute, even after Horsens' promotion to the Superliga in 2016. After signing a new three-year contract in May 2016, Sørensen made 10 appearances during the 2016–17 season and scored his first senior goal with a consolation in a 3–1 DBU Pokalen last-16 defeat to AGF Aarhus on 15 March 2017.

Sørensen appeared in Horsens' opening three matches of the 2017–18 season and scoring the first league goal of his career in a 4–1 victory over Lyngby on 23 July 2017. Despite that excellent start to the season, he departed the club on 31 July, just two days after his final appearance for the club. In just over two years as a first team player at the CASA Arena, Sørensen made 25 appearances and scored two goals. While a Horsens player, Sørensen filled the roles of left back, central defender, left midfield and emerged as a throw-in specialist, after receiving coaching from Thomas Grønnemark.

Brentford

2017–2019 
On 31 July 2017, Sørensen moved to England to join the B team at Championship club Brentford on a four-year contract for an undisclosed fee. Injuries to first team central defenders John Egan, Andreas Bjelland and Chris Mepham saw Sørensen feature as an unused substitute on five occasions during the 2017–18 season. He battled with homesickness during the season and adjusting to life in London, but received support on the field from Danish teammate Andreas Bjelland and off it from the club's sleep coach.

Sørensen was promoted into the first team squad for the 2018–19 season and made his debut for the club with a start in an EFL Cup first round match versus Southend United on 14 August 2018, but he was substituted with a dead leg after half an hour of the 4–2 victory. After returning to fitness, a knee injury suffered in October kept him out of action for  months. A season-ending injury suffered by central defender Yoann Barbet in late March 2019 allowed Sørensen to break into the starting lineup and he finished the 2018–19 season with 10 appearances.

2019–20 and loan to AFC Wimbledon 
A medial collateral ligament injury suffered prior to Brentford's first friendly of the 2019–20 pre-season kept Sørensen out until late September 2019. He resumed his involvement with the first team squad in November 2019 and made two appearances before signing a new -year contract (which included the option of a further year) in January 2020. Down the pecking order, on 9 January 2020, Sørensen joined League One club AFC Wimbledon on loan until the end of the 2019–20 season. The COVID-19 pandemic and the cancellation of the League One regular season led to his early return from the loan in March 2020. Sørensen made 9 appearances and helped the Dons to avoid relegation to League Two. Sørensen was ineligible to play during the remainder of Brentford's 2019–20 season, which ended with defeat in the 2020 Championship play-off Final.

2020–21 
After beginning the 2020–21 season making exclusively EFL Cup appearances, by November 2020, injury and illness suffered by central defenders Pontus Jansson and new signing Charlie Goode respectively allowed Sørensen to break into the league lineup alongside Ethan Pinnock. On 24 January 2021, Sørensen scored his first Brentford goal with the opener in a 3–1 FA Cup fourth round defeat to Leicester City. Injury to left back Rico Henry in February 2021 saw Sørensen deployed in the position until head coach Thomas Frank switched to a 3-5-2 formation in mid-April, at which time he dropped out of the starting lineup. Sørensen's breakthrough season was ended prematurely in May 2021, due to the necessary removal of his appendix and a stress fracture to his shin. By that point of the 2020–21 season, he had made 39 appearances and scored three goals. In his absence, Brentford gained promotion to the Premier League after a successful playoff campaign.

2021–22 
Sørensen returned fit for Brentford's 2021–22 pre-season and began the regular season fourth in the central defensive pecking order behind Pontus Jansson, Ethan Pinnock and new signing Kristoffer Ajer. He suffered a medial knee injury on his second appearance of the season, during a 3–1 EFL Cup second round win over Forest Green Rovers on 24 August 2021. He returned to the matchday squad in late November and had to wait until 22 December to make his comeback, with a start in a 2–0 EFL Cup quarter-final defeat to Chelsea. The departure of Charlie Goode on loan and injuries suffered by Ethan Pinnock and Zanka allowed Sørensen to start in Brentford's final five Premier League matches of the season. Sørensen finished a mid-table 2021–22 season with 15 appearances.

2022–23 and loans 
Despite injuries to Ethan Pinnock, Kristoffer Ajer, Charlie Goode and with Zanka yet to sign a new contract, Sørensen began the 2022–23 season as third-choice centre back, behind Pontus Jansson and new signing Ben Mee. After just 17 minutes of Premier League football and one EFL Cup start (on which he scored) during the opening month of the regular season, Sørensen joined French Ligue 1 club Nice on loan until the end of the 2022–23 season. Aside from two friendly appearances during a December 2022 training camp, Sørensen failed to make a competitive appearance for the club and was recalled by Brentford on 1 January 2023. Following two appearances, the one-year option on Sørensen's contract was taken up on 18 January 2023 and he joined Eredivisie club Groningen on loan until the end of the 2022–23 season. He went straight into the team, but suffered a broken forearm on his fourth appearance, late in a 1–1 draw with FC Twente on 5 February. The arm required surgery, which caused him to miss five matches.

International career 
Sørensen won his maiden call into the Denmark U18 squad in September 2016 and made 7 appearances during the 2016–17 season, captaining the team and scoring once in a 4–2 friendly victory over Belarus U18 on 18 October. He was promoted into the U19 squad in January 2017 and made two appearances during the remainder of the 2016–17 season. In mid-August 2017, Sørensen was named as captain of the Denmark U19 squad for the 2017 Four Nations Tournament, in which he made two appearances. Sørensen appeared in six of the 10 matches during the U21 team's successful 2021 European U21 Championship qualifying campaign and he was named in the squad for the Finals. He started each of Denmark's group matches and scored in a 2–0 win over Iceland U21 on 28 March 2021. Injury saw Sørensen replaced in the squad for the knockout stages, though his group stage performances were such that he was named in the Squad of the Tournament.

On 24 May 2022, Sørensen won his maiden call-up to the senior team when he was named in the initial 29-man squad for four 2022–23 Nations League A matches in June 2022. He was cut from the final 26-man selection.

Personal life 
Sørensen began his sporting career as a handball player, before switching to football. He is an Arsenal supporter.

Career statistics

Honours 

 UEFA European U21 Championship Squad of the Tournament: 2021

References

External links

 Mads Bech Sørensen at brentfordfc.com
 Mads Bech Sørensen at fcgroningen.nl

1999 births
Living people
Danish men's footballers
Danish Superliga players
Danish 1st Division players
AC Horsens players
Brentford F.C. players
Denmark youth international footballers
Danish expatriate men's footballers
Danish expatriate sportspeople in England
Association football central defenders
Association football fullbacks
Association football midfielders
People from Horsens
English Football League players
Denmark under-21 international footballers
AFC Wimbledon players
Premier League players
Sportspeople from the Central Denmark Region
Danish expatriate sportspeople in France
OGC Nice players
Danish expatriate sportspeople in the Netherlands
FC Groningen players
Eredivisie players